Asbecasite is a calcium titanium beryllium arsenite silicate mineral with the chemical formula . Its type locality is the Binn valley in Switzerland.

References

External links 
 Asbecasite data sheet
 Asbecasite on the Handbook of Mineralogy

Calcium minerals
Titanium minerals
Beryllium minerals
Tin minerals
Arsenites
Silicate minerals